Dictator perpetuo (English: "dictator in perpetuity"), also called dictator in perpetuum, was the office held by Julius Caesar from between 26 January and 15 February during the year 44 BCE until his death on 15 March. By abandoning the time restrictions usually applied in the case of the Roman dictatorship, it elevated Caesar's dictatorship into the monarchical sphere.

History 
Julius Caesar held the dictator position for only eleven days in 49 BCE (holding elections either as dictator Comit. habend. or as dictator rei gerundae causa) and again for the year 48/47 BCE. In 46 BCE, he was elected dictator for the next ten years. At some point between January and February 44 BCE he was appointed dictator perpetuo, but was assassinated less than two months later (on the Ides of March).  

Weinstock has argued that the perpetual dictatorship was part of the senatorial decrees regarding Caesar's divine honors, as well as his planned apotheosis as Divus Iulius, a complex of honors aimed at eternity and divinity.

See also
 President for life
 Roman Emperor
 Dictator
 José Gaspar Rodriguez de Francia, Ruler of Paraguay who held a similar title.

References

Bibliography 
 Michael Crawford, Roman Republican Coinage, Cambridge University Press, 1974, .

Heads of government
Heads of state
Latin political words and phrases
Positions of authority
Julius Caesar
Dictatorship